Prince Gaetano of Bourbon-Parma (11 June 1905 – 9 March 1958) was the youngest son of Robert I, the last reigning Duke of Parma and of his second wife Maria Antonia of Portugal. A prince of the House of Bourbon-Parma, he was educated in Austria, France, and Luxembourg. Prince Gaetan fought in the Spanish Civil War where he was wounded six times. In 1940, he enlisted in the U.S. Army, took part in the Normandy landings and made the campaign of France. He died at age 52 in a car accident near Cannes. He left a daughter from his marriage to Princess Margarete of Thurn und Taxis.

Early life 
Prince Gaetan of Bourbon-Parma was the youngest child of the last Duke of Parma, Robert I  (1848–1907) and his second wife Infanta Maria Antonia of Portugal (1862–1959), daughter of King Miguel of Portugal. Gaetan was the youngest of Duke Robert's twenty-four children. His father had married twice having twelve children in each marriage.

Gaetan was born at the Villa Pianore near Lucca, Tuscany. He was baptized as Gaetano Maria Giuseppe Pio. His godfather was Pope Pius X.  Gaetan was only two years old at the death of his father. He was sent to study at  Stella Matutina, a Catholic school for boys run by Jesuits priest in Feldkirch, near the Swiss border. At the fall of the Hapsburg dynasty he moved with his brother, Prince Sixtus of Bourbon-Parma to Paris. He finished his education in France and Luxembourg, where his brother Prince Felix of Bourbon-Parma was the husband of the reigning Grand duchess. He accompanied his brother Sixtus in his expeditions to Africa.

Marriage 
On 29 April 1931 at Paris, France, Prince Gaetan married Princess Margarete von Thurn und Taxis (1909 -2006), daughter of Prince Alexander von Thurn und Taxis, Duke of Castel Duino and Princess Marie Louise de Ligne. They were parents of an only daughter:

 Princess Diana of Bourbon-Parma (born in Paris on 22 May 1932 - 7 May 2020). ∞ 1955 Franz Joseph Prince of Hohenzollern-Sigmaringen ∞ 1961 Hans Joachim Oehmichen (1920-1995). She had three sons with her second husband.

Gaetan's marriage was unhappy. He and his wife lived apart for most of their marriage life. They divorced on 24 January 1950 in Paris.

Carlism 
During the 1930s Prince Gaetan was involved in the Carlist movement. His uncle Infante Alfonso Carlos, Duke of San Jaime died childless on 29 September 1936 and Gaetan's brother, Prince Xavier of Bourbon-Parma became the Regent of the traditionalist communion. At the outbreak of the Spanish Civil War on 12 January 1937, Gaetan joined the Requetés, the Third Battalion of Navarre, the Carlist militia, 
under the name of  Gaetan of Lavardin, with the approval of his brother Xavier. This placed him on the Fascist side in the Spanish Civil War. Since he later served in the United States Army in World War II, he is one of those who fought both for and against Fascism in the World War II era. 

On 7 April, the Third Navarre was assigned to dislodge the enemy from Mount Saibigain so as to open the way to Bilbao. The Third distinguished itself in the successful operation and was awarded a unit decoration for valor. D. Cayetano received a battlefield promotion to ensign for his role in the battle.

On 9 May, while in position in front of Bizcargui, Gaetan was wounded in the neck. He was taken to  the hospital "Alfonso Carlos" in Pamplona with serious injuries. At the hospital he was forced to reveal his true identity. While there he was visited by Colonel Rada, who awarded him a battlefield promotion to lieutenant, again for conspicuous bravery before the enemy. He was also visited during his convalescence by his sister Zita of Bourbon-Parma, last Empress of Austria-Hungary through her marriage to Charles I of Austria and IV of Hungary, and his nephew Otto Habsburg-Lorraine, son of Zita.

Later life 
He fled Europe in 1941 for the United States, where he was drafted into the United States Army two years later,
During  World War II, he participated on the side of the Allies, along with his brothers Javier and Felix, the last Grand Duke of Luxembourg by marriage to Charlotte of Luxembourg. In 1943 he tried to enlist in a battalion of Austrians who served in the U.S. Army but was rejected by its French origin. Later he taught at Camp Ritchie, in which a Jewish-German to conduct special operations in Germany formed young, took part in the landing of Normandy and fought the campaign for France.

Death
On the way to visit his brother Luigi prince of Bourbon-Parma, Prince Gaetan suffered a serious car accident in Mandelieu-la-Napoule, on the French Riviera on 8 March 1958. He was taken to a hospital in Cannes where he died the next day.  As he had wished, he was buried wearing the red beret of the Requetés of Navarre on 10 March 1958.

References 

Romero Raizábal, Ignacio,  El Príncipe Requeté , Aldus, Santander (1966).

1905 births
1958 deaths
Carlists
House of Bourbon-Parma
Road incident deaths in France
Ritchie Boys
Sons of monarchs